Ying County or Yingxian is a county in the north of Shanxi province, China. It is the easternmost county-level division of the prefecture-level city of Shuozhou.

Ying County is best known for the Pagoda of Fogong Temple, which is built in 1056 and was the tallest timber building in the world built before the rise of modern timber skyscrapers in the 2010s.

Climate

References

External links
www.xzqh.org 

 
County-level divisions of Shanxi
Shuozhou